Peter Bichener (born 22 February 1941) was an English cricketer. He was a right-handed batsman and a right-arm medium-pace bowler who played for Bedfordshire. He was born in Bedford.

Having represented the team in the Minor Counties Championship between 1968 and 1971, Bichener made a single List A appearance for the team, during the 1971 Gillette Cup, against Essex, in a match which Bedfordshire lost by a 97-run margin. Bichener took two wickets in the match, including that of Brian Ward.

See also
 Minor Counties Cricket Championship

References

1941 births
Living people
English cricketers
Bedfordshire cricketers
Sportspeople from Bedford